John Huckert (born June 26, 1954) is an American filmmaker.

Partial filmography

Created by
SWEAT (TV pilot 2013)

Director
The Passing (1983)
Hard  (1998)
Garden of Dreams (2005)
Strangers Online  (2010)

Writer
The Passing (1983, co-screenplay)
Hard (1998, co-screenplay)
Slaughter Studios (2002, co-screenplay)
Shakedown (2002, co-screenplay)
DinoCroc  (2004, co-screenplay)
Garden of Dreams (2005, co-screenplay)
Strangers Online (2010, co-screenplay)

Producer
The Passing (1983, co-producer)
Hard (1998, co-producer)
DinoCroc (2004, co-producer)
Strangers Online (2010, co-producer)

References

External links
 

1954 births
American film directors
American film producers
Living people